Major-General Arthur Crawford Daly,  (14 May 1871 – 28 August 1936) was a senior British Army officer.

Military career
Daly was the eighth child and youngest son of General Sir Henry Dermot Daly and Susan Kirkpatrick, and the brother of Hugh Daly. He was educated at Winchester College and the Royal Military College, Sandhurst, prior to being commissioned into the Welch Regiment in 1890. He was subsequently transferred to the West Yorkshire Regiment, was promoted to lieutenant on 7 March 1892, and then to captain on 15 February 1899. Appointed adjutant of the 2nd battalion on 15 February 1898, he first saw active service in the Second Boer War, during which he was severely wounded during action in Natal. He was reported seriously ill with enteric fever near Pietermaritzburg in March 1900, but recovered, was mentioned in despatches (dated 8 April 1902), and received a brevet promotion as major in the South African Honours list published on 26 June 1902. Following the end of the war in June 1902, he left Cape Town on the SS Sicilia and returned to Southampton in late July, where he went back as a regular officer in his regiment.

After the outbreak of the First World War, Daly became Deputy Assistant Quartermaster-General of the IV Corps in October 1914. He was assistant adjutant and quartermaster general of the 7th Division between 1914 and 1915. He was promoted to lieutenant-colonel in 1915, was given his first brigade command, the 6th Brigade, the same year. He then commanded the 33rd Infantry Brigade between February and September 1917, when he was made commander of the 24th Division. He held this post until the division was disbanded in 1919. Daly was made a Companion of the Order of the Bath in 1918 and a Companion of the Order of St Michael and St George in 1919. He was Inspector-General and Military Advisor to Minister of Defence in Iraq between 1925 and 1927, and retired from the army in 1928.

Daly married Grace Wilkinson, the daughter of Major H. C. Wilkinson, in 1897. Together they had two children. Daly's son was Air Vice-Marshal George Dermot Daly (1898–1974). Daly died in Sevenoaks, Kent, in 1936.

References

1871 births
1936 deaths
Welch Regiment officers
West Yorkshire Regiment officers
British Army generals of World War I
British Army personnel of the Second Boer War
Companions of the Order of the Bath
Companions of the Order of St Michael and St George
People educated at Winchester College
British Army major generals
Graduates of the Royal Military College, Sandhurst